The Gallery was a disco in SoHo, Manhattan which was opened in February 1972 by disc jockey Nicky Siano and his older brother Joe Siano. The first location of The Gallery, located on 132 West 22nd Street, closed in July 1974. It reopened in November 1974 at 172 Mercer and Houston Streets and closed in October 1977.   Famed DJs Larry Levan and Frankie Knuckles both worked at the club, but not at the DJ booth. Grace Jones and Loleatta Holloway both made their debut performances at The Gallery.

Disco's House of Worship
The disco era produced an attitude and culture popular among a majority of the population, but proved to be an especially crucial time for the emergence and empowerment of traditionally marginalized and disadvantaged groups, as blacks, gays, and women found security in the community built around dance clubs such as The Gallery.  This safety provided by The Gallery in the 1970s created a catharsis for minorities though the temporary relief from harsh outside realities.  The club “[featured] ritualized activities centered around music, dance, and worship, in which there [were] no set boundaries between secular and sacred domains”.

Popular references
John Mayer mentions The Gallery in his song "City Love".

Further reading
 Love Goes to Buildings on Fire: Five Years in New York That Changed Music Forever by Will Hermes, Farrar, Straus and Giroux (2012)
 Last Night a DJ Saved My Life: The History of the Disc Jockey by Bill Brewster and Frank Broughton, Grove Atlantic (2014)
 Love Saves the Day: A History of American Dance Music Culture, 1970-1979 by Tim Lawrence, Duke University Press (2004)
 Hold On to Your Dreams: Arthur Russell and the Downtown Music Scene, 1973-1992 by Tim Lawrence, Duke University Press (2009)
 Turn the Beat Around: The Secret History of Disco by Peter Shapiro, Faber and Faber (2005)
 The Record Players: DJ Revolutionaries by Bill Brewster and Frank Broughton, Black Cat (2010)
 Disco: The Music, The Times, The Era by Johnny Morgan, Sterling (2011)
 "'The 1970s club scene in New York was special': Nicky Siano" by Will Coldwell, The Guardian (Apr 7, 2017)
 "You Better Work!": Underground Dance Music in New York by Kai Fikentscher, Wesleyan University Press (2000)
 "Nicky Siano on disco, drugs and DJing at Studio 54", The Vinyl Factory
 "Nicky Siano on the Gallery and the Dark Days of Disco", DJHistory.com
 "Welcome to The Gallery!", Standard Hotels

References 

Nightclubs in Manhattan